Peter Simple is an 1834 novel written by Frederick Marryat about a young British midshipman during the Napoleonic wars. It was originally published in serialized form in 1833.

Plot summary

The novel describes the naval career of a young gentleman during the period of British Mastery of the seas in the early 19th century. The hero of the title is introduced as 'the fool of the family', son of a parson and heir presumptive to the influential Lord Privilege. This forms a subplot among several others that run alongside the main narrative which mainly concerns the young man's journey from adolescent to adulthood amidst a backdrop of war at sea.

One of the key components of the tale is Peter's relationship with the various shipmates he meets, mainly an older officer who takes young Simple under his wing and proves invaluable in his sea education, and also a post captain who suffers from Münchausen syndrome, among others.

Adaptation
In 1957 it was adapted into a BBC television series The Adventures of Peter Simple starring Timothy Bateson.

External links
Project Gutenberg version of the text
 

Novels by Frederick Marryat
1834 British novels
1830s children's books
Novels set during the Napoleonic Wars
Novels first published in serial form
British children's books
British children's novels